Audi S and RS models are a range of high performance versions of certain car models of the German automotive company Audi AG. These cars primarily focus on enhanced "sport" performance. Production of Audi "S" cars began in 1990 with the S2 Coupé, whilst the first "RS" car appeared four years later with the Audi RS 2 Avant.

Today's S and RS models are based on the A/TT/Q models with the same number (e.g. S4/RS 4 is based on the A4 or the TT RS based on the TT), but the "Ur-S4" from 1991 to 1994 was based on the Audi 100/200 later named A6 and the first S2/RS2 generation from 1990 to 1995 was based on the Audi 80/90 platform later replaced by the A4.

History
The history of road versions of Audi racing cars begins in the 1980s, from models Audi Quattro and Audi Sport Quattro made by concern Audi AG in the city of Ingolstadt. In 1983, the company Quattro GmbH was founded (since November 2016, "Audi Sport GmbH") in the city of Neckarsulm responsible for the development of sports models of cars of Audi brand. In 1990, appeared based on the model Audi 80 sports model S2 as a receiver Audi Quattro but already under the designation of the series "S" in the name and having a capacity of 220 hp. And in 1994 there was even more powerful model Audi RS2 Avant based on Audi 80 model of joint development of Audi and Porsche having 315 hp. The model was equipped with components from Porsche. As in 1973, Audi, together with Porsche, also developed a prototype based on the Audi 100 Coupé S, produced in 1968, which has 112 hp. the "Grand tourer" class. which received the name  100 Coupé S V3 and was equipped with a V8 engine with a power of 350 hp.

Since 1994, the development of the Audi S and RS sports series was started directly from the Quattro.

S models
Numerous "S" models, from most of Audi's mainstream model ranges have been produced over the years. These cars are recognisable by their "S" badges, and unique emphasis lines on their front grills and on the back side, instead of the letter "A" in the designation of numbers and also in use in the notation "S3", "TTS" and "SQ5".

All Audi "S" models are equipped with Audi's 'trademark' quattro four-wheel drive system as standard. Unique internal combustion engines, along with larger, more powerful brakes, stiffer suspension systems, additional exterior body styling, and carbon fibre interior trims set them apart from their related "siblings" of their respective model range.

In the past, some Audi S models competed directly with BMW M and Mercedes-AMG models, especially if Audi RS models are not offered, such as the B6 Audi S4 4.2 FSI versus the BMW M3 and Mercedes-Benz C32 AMG. Since 2010 however, Audi S models have been positioned more as optional engine trims. For instance the base Audi A4 (B8) engine is the 2.0 TFSI turbo four-cylinder, and with the discontinuation of the 3.2 FSI V6, that makes the Audi S4's 3.0 TFSI V6 the performance option (the B8 Audi S4 3.0 TFSI positioned closer to the E90 BMW 335i than the BMW M3). The Audi A6 (C7) no longer has a V8 engine upgrade in the non "S" range, with the discontinuation of the C6 Audi A6 4.2 FSI that was offered from 2004 – 2011, one must go to the C7 Audi S6 4.0 TFSI.

Audi "S" models should not be confused with the Audi "A, Q, TT" series, equipped with a package "S line" models, which feature leather trim, S-line badging, sports steering wheel and sports suspension, but they are not equipped with a high-power engine.

RS models

Audi Sport GmbH (formerly quattro GmbH), AUDI AGs high performance private subsidiary, creates even higher performance versions, known by their "RS" badging. The "RS" initials are taken from the  — literally translated as "racing sport". The characteristics and cost of these cars are equated to cars belonging to the supercar class.

RS is Audi's highest performance 'top-tier' trim level, positioned distinctly above the "S" ("Sport") specification level of Audi's regular model range. All "RS" cars pioneer some of Audi's latest and most advanced technology and engineering prowess, therefore, "RS" cars are considered by some as "halo vehicles". Audi RS cars are some of the most powerful vehicles ever offered by Audi as well as R8. Audi RS 6 (5.0 TFSI quattro), for instance, is more powerful than the physically larger Audi S8 (5.2 FSI quattro). However, the 2012 — 2015 Audi S8 shares the same engine as the 2013 — ... Audi RS 6 and Audi RS7, albeit in a lower state of tune, while for the 2016 — 2017 model years, the facelifted Audi S8 plus is considered 'an "RS" in anything but name as it features an uprated engine with the same output as the smaller RS 6 and RS7. The 2016-17 S8 Plus was built by Quattro GmbH and has a VIN number that starts with WUA to identify it, compared to previous versions of the S8 which were built by Audi on the regular assembly line alongside other A8 variants.

Available for limited time and only in select markets, on a restricted model range, these "RS" (and "S" models) models are wholly designed, developed and produced in-house by Audi AG's high performance private subsidiary company, Audi Sport GmbH, at its Neckarsulm factory.

Unlike Audi "S" models whose interiors are well-furnished in order to retain the feel of sport luxury, the interior of Audi "RS" models are often spartan by comparison as the emphasis is more on track performance than luxury. The 2008 Audi RS 4 sold in Europe had lightweight racing-style front seats and roll-up windows for the rear doors, although its counterpart sold in the United States has luxurious power-adjustable front seats and power windows for all doors 2008 BMW M3 vs. 2007 Audi RS 4, 2008 M-B C63 AMG.

Audi "RS" models are considered direct competitors to similar sized hardcore sport models from BMW M and Mercedes-AMG, whereas the Audi "S" models (as of 2010) have been positioned more as engine upgrade trims. Taking the 2012 model year for example, the Audi RS 5 competes directly with the BMW M3, M4 whereas the Audi S5 competes with the BMW 335i, while the Audi RS 6 competes with the BMW M5 and the Audi S6 competes with the BMW 550i. However the Audi RS 6 (C6) was never exported to the United States due to emissions regulations, leaving the Audi S6 (C6) as the top performing trim to compete against the BMW M5 (E60) in that market 2013 Audi S7.

There used to be only one RS model in production at a time, but recently Audi has revised its policies and decided to make more than one RS model at a time, claiming that "customers want them, then why not give it to them".

Model range
The following Audi "S" and "RS" high performance models are being, or have been produced, or are speculated to be in future production:

Current models
(In model range order)

Former models
(In chronological order of production end — oldest first)

Audi S line

Audi produce a specification of optional sports trim packages to their mainstream models A/Q/TT, known as the S line. This is merely a trim specification which allows customers to effect a sporty appearance in their mainstream Audi model. Whilst the specific S line trim parts are designed and produced by Audi Sport GmbH at its Neckarsulm factory, these mainstream cars are still manufactured and assembled by AUDI AG at their relevant factories on the same production lines alongside their other standard models.

Cars with S line trim are not to be confused with the specific high performance offerings — the "S" models (made by AUDI AG), and the "RS" models (made by Audi Sport GmbH); Audi cars with S line trim bear identical performance figures to their counterparts with base or SE trim levels.

See also

Audi Sport Quattro
Audi 100 Coupé S
Audi S1
Audi S2
Audi RS2
Audi S3
Audi S4
Audi RS4
Audi S6
Audi RS6
Audi S7
Audi RS7
Audi S8
Audi R8
Audi A8 W12
Audi Q7 V12 TDI

References

Further reading

External links

Audi international — Audi S and RS models — full model range from Audi MediaServices 
Audi UK — RS models
Audi S models microsite 
Audi Sport 
Audi Sport® USA 
Audi RS models and the Audi R8 

Sports sedans
Station wagons
Coupés
Convertibles
All-wheel-drive vehicles
Executive cars
Lists of cars